is a Japanese fantasy novel series written by Rieko Hinata and illustrated by Akihiro Yamada. Holp Shuppan have published four volumes between December 2018 and September 2020. An anime television series adaptation by Signal.MD aired from January to March 2023. A second season has been announced.

Plot
In the distant future, a calamity has changed human physiology so that humans will instantly combust when in the presence of fire. As a result, human civilization collapsed until they discover an alternative fuel source derived from the blood of demonic Fire Fiends. As a result, the elite Fire Hunters are formed, whose sole purpose is to hunt down Fire Fiends and harvest their blood, fueling a new industrial revolution. 

Touko, a young girl who lives in a remote village, wanders into the forest and stumbles into a battle between a Fire Hunter and a Fire Fiend. The Fire Hunter is mortally wounded saving Touko, with his last words telling her the name of his dog, Kanata. Due to being responsible for the Fire Hunter's death, Touko is tasked by her village to take Kanata and the slain Fire Hunter's belongings to the Capital and return them to his family. Feeling responsible as well, Touko embarks on the long and dangerous journey to the Capital to fulfill her duty.

Characters

Media

Novel

Anime
An anime television series adaptation produced by Signal.MD was announced on November 5, 2020. The anime is directed by Junji Nishimura, with Mamoru Oshii supervising and writing the scripts, Takuya Saito designing the characters, and Kenji Kawai composing the music. It aired from January 14 to March 18, 2023, on the television channel WOWOW. The opening themes song is "Usotsuki" (嘘つき; Liar) by Leo Ieiri. Crunchyroll licensed the series outside of Asia.

After the tenth and final episode of the first season, a second season was announced.

Episode list

References

External links
 
 

2018 Japanese novels
2023 anime television series debuts
Anime and manga based on novels
Crunchyroll anime
Fantasy anime and manga
IG Port franchises
Japanese fantasy novels
Signal.MD
Upcoming anime television series
Wowow original programming